A condyloid joint (also called condylar, ellipsoidal, or bicondylar) is an ovoid articular surface, or condyle that  is received into an elliptical cavity. This permits movement in two planes, allowing flexion, extension, adduction, abduction, and circumduction.

Examples
Examples include:
 the wrist-joint
 metacarpophalangeal joints
 metatarsophalangeal joints
 atlanto-occipital joints
These are also called ellipsoid joints. The oval-shaped condyle of one bone fits into the elliptical cavity of the other bone. These joints allow biaxial movements—i.e., forward and backward, or from side to side, but not rotation. Radiocarpal joint and Metacarpo-phalangeal joint are examples of condyloid joints.

An example of an Ellipsoid joint is the wrist; it functions similarly to the ball and socket joint except is unable to rotate 360 degrees; it prohibits axial rotation.

References

Joints